The Cambria Casino, also known as the Flying V Guest Ranch and the Cambria Casino Park-Memorial, is a resort on the western edge of the Black Hills in Weston County, Wyoming. The resort was named for Cambria, a nearby coal-mining community. The two-story sandstone lodge, designed by New York architect Bruce Rabenold,  employs English Tudor and other medieval details to create a Tudor manor-like setting in the Wyoming hills. The lodge fronts on a court, entered through a gatehouse and originally flanked by wings housing guest rooms. The property is significant as an example of a unique eclectically style resort in eastern Wyoming. A portion of the casino was intended to serve as a memorial to Cambria-area miners.

The dance hall opened on January 12, 1929. Seventy-five guests could be accommodated in the main building and in six cottages. The cottages have since been removed.

The interior features a second floor ballroom with a timber-framed roof resembling a medieval hammer-beam truss. The timbers may have come from area mines. Beneath the ballroom were a dining room, auxiliary dining room, kitchen sitting room and six guest rooms.

The Cambria Casino was placed on the National Register of Historic Places in 1980.

References

External links
 at the National Park Service's NRHP database
Cambria Casino/Flying V Guest Ranch at the Wyoming State Historic Preservation Office

Hotel buildings completed in 1927
Buildings and structures in Weston County, Wyoming
Hotel buildings on the National Register of Historic Places in Wyoming
National Register of Historic Places in Weston County, Wyoming